A catechism (from , "to teach orally") is a summary or exposition of doctrine and serves as a learning introduction to the Sacraments traditionally used in catechesis, or Christian religious teaching of children and adult converts. Catechisms are doctrinal manuals – often in the form of questions followed by answers to be memorised – a format that has been used in non-religious or secular contexts as well. According to Norman DeWitt, the early Christians appropriated this practice from the Epicureans, a school whose founder Epicurus had instructed to keep summaries of the teachings for easy learning. The term catechumen refers to the designated recipient of the catechetical work or instruction. In the Catholic Church, catechumens are those who are preparing to receive the Sacrament of Baptism. Traditionally, they would be placed separately during Holy Mass from those who had been baptized, and would be dismissed from the liturgical assembly before the Profession of Faith (Nicene Creed) and General Intercessions (Prayers of the Faithful).

Catechisms are characteristic of Western Christianity but are also present in Eastern Orthodox Christianity. In 1973, The Common Catechism, the first joint catechism of Catholics and Protestants, was published by theologians of the major Western Christian traditions, as a result of extensive ecumenical dialogue.

Format
Before the Protestant Reformation, Christian catechesis took the form of instruction in and memorization of the Apostles' Creed, Lord's Prayer, and basic knowledge of the sacraments. However there were also more comprehensive documents that outlined of the Christian faith, such as the Catechetical Lectures of St. Cyril of Jerusalem, "The Morals" of St. Basil of Caesarea, and the Enchiridion on Faith, Hope and Love by St. Augustine of Hippo. The earliest known catechism is the Didache, which was written between 60 and 85 AD. 

The word "catechism" for a manual for this instruction appeared in the Late Middle Ages. The use of a question and answer format was popularized by Martin Luther in his 1529 Small Catechism. He wanted the catechumen to understand what he was learning, so the Decalogue, Lord's Prayer, and Apostles' Creed were broken up into small sections, with the question "What does this mean" following each portion. The format calls upon two parties to participate, a master and a student (traditionally termed a "scholar"), or a parent and a child. The Westminster Shorter Catechism (1647) is an example:

Q. What is the chief end of man?
A. To glorify God and enjoy Him forever!

Q. What rule hath God given to direct us how we may glorify and enjoy Him?
A. The word of God which is contained in the Scriptures of the Old and New Testaments is the only rule to direct us how we may glorify and enjoy him.

Protestant catechisms

The catechism's question-and-answer format, with a view toward the instruction of children, was a form adopted by the various Protestant confessions almost from the beginning of the Reformation.

Among the first projects of the Reformation was the production of catechisms self-consciously modelled after the older traditions of Cyril of Jerusalem and Augustine. These catechisms showed special admiration for Chrysostom's view of the family as a "little church", and placed strong responsibility on every father to teach his children, to prevent them from coming to baptism or the Lord's table ignorant of the doctrine under which they are expected to live as Christians.

Lutheran catechisms
Luther's Large Catechism (1529) typifies the emphasis which the churches of the Augsburg Confession placed on the importance of knowledge and understanding of the articles of the Christian faith. Primarily intended as instruction to teachers, especially to parents, the catechism consists of a series of exhortations on the importance of each topic of the catechism. It is meant for those who have the capacity to understand, and is meant to be memorized and then repeatedly reviewed so that the Small Catechism could be taught with understanding. For example, the author stipulates in the preface:

Luther adds:

Luther's Small Catechism, in contrast, is written to accommodate the understanding of a child or an uneducated person. It begins:

Reformed catechisms

Calvin's 1545 preface to the Genevan catechism begins with an acknowledgement that the several traditions and cultures which were joined in the Reformed movement would produce their own form of instruction in each place. While Calvin argues that no effort should be expended on preventing this, he adds:

The scandal of diverse instruction is that it produces diverse baptisms and diverse communions, and diverse faith. However, forms may vary without introducing substantial differences, according to the Reformed view of doctrine.

Genevan Catechism

John Calvin produced a catechism while at Geneva (1541), which underwent two major revisions (1545 and 1560). Calvin's aim in writing the catechism of 1545 was to set a basic pattern of doctrine, meant to be imitated by other catechists, which would not affirm local distinctions or dwell on controversial issues, but would serve as a pattern for what was expected to be taught by Christian fathers and other teachers of children in the church. The catechism is organized on the topics of faith, law, prayer and sacraments.

Heidelberg Catechism

After Protestantism entered into the Palatinate, in 1546 the controversy between Lutherans and Calvinists broke out, and especially while the region was under the elector Otto Heinrich (1556–1559), this conflict in Saxony, particularly in Heidelberg, became increasingly bitter and turned violent.

When Frederick III, Elector Palatine, came into power in 1559 he put his authority behind the Calvinistic view on the Lord's Supper, which denied the local presence of the body of Jesus Christ in the elements of the sacrament. He turned Sapienz College into a school of divinity, and in 1562 he placed over it a pupil and friend of Luther's colleague, Philipp Melanchthon, named Zacharias Ursinus. In an attempt to resolve the religious disputes in his domain, Frederick called upon Ursinus and his colleague Caspar Olevianus (preacher to Frederick's court) to produce a catechism. The two collaborators referred to existing catechetical literature, and especially relied on the catechisms of Calvin and of John Lasco. To prepare the catechism, they adopted the method of sketching drafts independently, and then bringing together the work to combine their efforts. "The final preparation was the work of both theologians, with the constant co-operation of Frederick III. Ursinus has always been regarded as the principal author, as he was afterwards the chief defender and interpreter of the Catechism; still, it would appear that the nervous German style, the division into three parts (as distinguished from the five parts in the Catechism of Calvin and the previous draft of Ursinus), and the genial warmth and unction of the whole work, are chiefly due to Olevianus." (Schaff, in. Am. Presb. Rev. July 1863, p. 379). The structure of the Heidelberg Catechism is spelled out in the second question; and the three-part structure seen there is based on the belief that the single work of salvation brings forward the three persons of the Trinity in turn, to make God fully and intimately known by his work of salvation, referring to the Apostles' Creed as an epitome of Christian faith. Assurance of salvation is the unifying theme throughout this catechism: assurance obtained by the work of Christ, applied through the sacraments, and resulting in grateful obedience to the commandments and persistence in prayer.

The Heidelberg Catechism is the most widely used of the Catechisms of the Reformed churches.

Westminster Catechisms

Together with the Westminster Confession of Faith (1647), the Westminster Assembly also produced two catechisms, a Larger and a Shorter, which were intended for use in Christian families and in churches. These documents have served as the doctrinal standards, subordinate to the Bible, for Presbyterians and other Reformed churches around the world. The Shorter Catechism shows the Assembly's reliance upon the previous work of Calvin, Lasco, and the theologians of Heidelberg. It comprises two main sections summarizing what the Scriptures principally teach: the doctrine of God, and the duty required of men. Questions and answers cover the usual elements: faith, the Ten Commandments, the sacraments, and prayer.

Other Reformed catechisms

Oecolampadius composed the Basel Catechism in 1526, Leo Juda (1534) followed by Bullinger (1555) published catechisms in Zurich. The French Reformed used Calvin's Genevan catechism, as well as works published by Louis Cappel (1619), and Charles Drelincourt (1642).

Baptist catechisms

Most Baptists do not have a formal catechism. However, Keach's Catechism is utilized in many Particular Baptist congregations. Nondenominational Reformed Baptist preacher John Piper wrote a commentary on this catechism, publishing it in 1986.

Pentecostal catechisms

While the Pentecostal movement has no one official catechism or confession, nevertheless Pentecostal authors have produced catechetical works. William Seymour, founder of the Azusa Street revival, included a catechism in the Doctrines and Disciplines of the Azusa Street Apostolic Faith Mission. Assemblies of God minister Warren D. Combs produced a catechism in the 1960s. In 2016 Henry Volk the host of the Theology in Perspective podcast authored a resource entitled, A Pentecostal Catechism.

Anglican catechism

The Anglican Book of Common Prayer includes a catechism. In older editions it is a brief manual for the instruction of those preparing to be brought before the bishop for confirmation: the baptised first professes his baptism, and then rehearses the principal elements of the faith into which he has been baptised: the Apostles' Creed, Ten Commandments, the Lord's Prayer, and the sacraments.

Catechist: What is your Name?
Answer: N. or M.
Catechist: Who gave you this Name?
Answer: My Godfathers and Godmothers
in my Baptism; wherein I was made a member of Christ, the child of God, and an inheritor of the kingdom of heaven.

The "N. or M." stands for the Latin, "nomen vel nomina", meaning "name or names". It is an accident of typography that "nomina" came to be represented by "m".

The US-based Episcopal Church's 1979 prayer book has a considerably longer catechism intended as "an outline of instruction" and "a brief summary of the Church's teaching".

William Nicholson's "An exposition of the catechism of the Church of England" was published in 1655.

Vernon Staley's "The Catholic religion : a manual of instruction for members of the Anglican Church" was published in 1908.

"To Be A Christian: An Anglican Catechism" was published in 2020 by Anglican House Media Ministries (ACNA).

"The Catechism An Outline of the Faith' was published in 1998 by Church of Wales.

Samuel Clarke "An exposition of the church-catechism" was published in 1719

Thomas Secker "Lectures on the Catechism of the Church of England" were published in 1769 (vol. I and vol. II)

Discourses on the commandments was published in 1824

A familiar and practical improvement of the church catechism was published in 1775

Stephen Wilkinson Dowell "A catechism on the services of the Church of England" was published in 1852

Zacheus Isham "The Catechism of the Church: with Proofs from the New Testament: and Some Additional Questions and Answers" was published in 1694

Methodist catechisms
The Probationer's Catechism was authored by Methodist divine S. Olin Garrison for probationary members of the Methodist Episcopal Church seeking full membership in the connexion; it has been one of the most widely used catechisms in Methodist history. A Catechism on the Christian Religion: The Doctrines of Christianity with Special Emphasis on Wesleyan Concepts by Mel-Thomas and Helen Rothwell is another popular catechism used to explicate Wesleyan-Arminian theology. More recent publications are A Catechism Prepared Especially for the Members of the Evangelical Wesleyan Church (printed in the United States), A Larger Catechism: For Members of the Christian Methodist Episcopal Church (printed in the United States), and A Catechism for the Use of the People Called Methodists (printed in Great Britain).

Socinian and other sectarian catechisms

Besides the manuals of instruction that were published by the Protestants for use in their families and churches, there were other works produced by sectarian groups intended as a compact refutation of orthodoxy.

For example, Socinians in Poland published the Racovian Catechism in 1605, using the question and answer format of a catechism for the orderly presentation of their arguments against the Trinity and the doctrine of Hell, as these were understood by the Reformed churches from which they were forced to separate.

The Anabaptists have also produced catechisms of their own, to explain and defend their distinctives.

Catholic catechisms

The Catechism of the Catholic Church (see below) is the catechism that is in most widespread use among Catholics today. It is the official catechism of the Church.

For Catholics, all the canonical books of the Bible (including the Deuterocanonical books), the tradition of the Church and the interpretation of these by the Magisterium (which may be outlined in a catechism, a compendium or a declaration) constitute the complete and best resource for fully attaining to God's revelation to mankind. Catholics believe that sacred scripture and sacred tradition preserved and interpreted by the Magisterium are both necessary for attaining to the fullest understanding of all of God's revelation.

The term catechist is most frequently used in Catholicism, often to describe a lay catechist or layperson with catechetical training who engages in such teaching and evangelization. This can be in both parish church and mission contexts.

List of Notable Catechisms

Other Catechisms

Catechism of Christian Doctrine (or "Penny Catechism")
A question and answer format catechism that was the standard catechetical text in Great Britain in the earlier part of the 20th century. Popularly called the Penny Catechism, as the original version only cost one penny. Various editions of the Penny Catechism were issued through the century and changes were made to the text.

Enchiridion symbolorum, definitionum et declarationum de rebus fidei et morum
The Enchiridion symbolorum, definitionum et declarationum de rebus fidei et morum also known as Enchiridion or Denzinger, is a compendium of all basic texts of Catholic dogma and morality since the apostles. Commissioned by Pope Pius IX, it has been in use since 1854, and has been updated periodically. It is a compendium of faith, like a catechism. By including all relevant teachings throughout history, it is at the same, more than a catechism. It is a search instrument for theologians, historians and anybody interested in Christian religion. The latest updates of the Enchiridion extend to the teachings of Pope John Paul II.

The Archbishop of Baltimore Cardinal James Gibbons is quoted in earlier versions of the Enchiridion, that every theologian should have always two books at hand, the Holy Bible and this Enchiridion.

Catechism for Filipino Catholics 
The Catechism for Filipino Catholics (CFC) is a contextualised and inculturated Filipino Catholic catechism prepared by the Catholic Bishops' Conference of the Philippines and approved by the Holy See. The draft was produced by the Conference's "Episcopal Commission on Catechesis and Catholic Education," and is an update of the late 16th century Doctrina Christiana en Lengua Espanola Y Tagala, which was a Hispano-Tagalog version of the earlier Hispano-Chinese Doctrina that was the first book printed in the Philippines using moveable type.

The Doctrina Cristiana was written in Tagalog (both in a hispanised Latin script and the then-common indigenous Baybayin script), as well as Spanish. Amongst the contents of the Doctrina are the Spanish alphabet and phonics, basic prayers shown in both languages – in the case of the Tagalog, using archaic words and both scripts – and a brief catechism in question-and-answer format.

The Catechetical Instructions of St. Thomas Aquinas
The catechetical instructions of Saint Thomas Aquinas were used generally throughout the 13th and 14th centuries as manuals and textbooks for priests and teachers of religion. "The Explanations of St. Thomas," wrote Spirago, "are remarkable for their conciseness and their simplicity of language; they are especially noteworthy because the main parts of the catechetical course of instruction are brought into connection with one another so that they appear as one harmonious whole." The influence of these works is especially prominent in the "Roman Catechism" which the Council of Trent ordered written for parish priests and for all teachers of religion. Many of the explanatory passages in both works are almost identical.

Ignorantia sacerdotum
Ignorantia Sacerdotum are the first words and the better-known title of De Informatione Simplicium, a catechetical manual drafted by Archbishop Pecham's provincial Council of Lambeth in 1281. It called for the memorisation of the Apostles' Creed, the Ten Commandments, and the two-fold injunction to "love the Lord thy God with all thy heart... and thy neighbour as thyself.".

It also emphasised the Seven Virtues, the Seven Deadly Sins, the Seven Sacraments, and the Seven Works of Mercy.

A 1357 translation into English is often called the Lay-Folk's Catechism.

Tradivox
Tradivox (or the Catholic Catechism Index) is a multi-volume book series by Sophia Institute Press, which restores and reprints Catholic catechisms. Ongoing, it will consist of twenty cross-indexed hardcover volumes upon the series' completion. The project received several endorsements from prominent members of the Catholic clergy & public, including Cardinal Burke, Cardinal Müller, Cardinal Pell, Bishop Strickland, Bishop Schneider, & theologian Peter Kwasniewski. Schneider also provided a foreword in the hardcover edition of Vol. 1.

Content

Orthodox catechisms
Unlike the Catholic Church there is no teaching Magisterium in the Orthodox world. Most catechumens are instructed orally by a deacon or priest at the church. Also, there is more emphasis on being taught by simply being in church, and listening to the services. Most Orthodox would refer back to the original writings of the Church Fathers, including the Catechetical Lectures of St. Cyril of Jerusalem and The Ladder of Divine Ascent. New catechumens would generally be encouraged to read "The Orthodox Church" by Kallistos Ware to get an overview of the Christian faith from an Orthodox perspective before being given more advanced readings.

In recent times, perhaps under influence from the West, a number of catechisms have emerged in the Eastern Orthodox Church such as the Philaret Catechism, which is entitled, "The Longer Catechism of The Orthodox, Catholic, Eastern Church," "A new-style catechism on the Eastern Orthodox faith for adults" by Rev. George Mastrantonis, and the more modern "The Orthodox Faith" by Protopresbyter Thomas Hopko. However, presently such catechisms are not widely used.

The Oriental Orthodox Churches rely heavily on the Didascalia Apostolorum. The Ethiopic version is known as the "Ethiopic Didascalia." It is included in the Orthodox Tewahedo biblical canon, and is read from on Sundays. The faith of the Coptic Orthodox Church has historically been evidenced in the lives and sayings of the early desert monks, which was recorded in "The paradise of the holy fathers," Volume 1 and Volume 2. Recently the Coptic church has used Fr. Tadros Malaty's books, along with Pope Shenouda III of Alexandria's many books, to help lay people better understand their Coptic faith. However, like the Eastern Orthodox church, the faith is mostly expounded in the lives of the saints

and the material recited during the services.

Non-Christian catechisms

Catechisms represent an obvious, practical method of passing on instruction, and as such examples can be found in many traditions. For example, Asiatic schools of esoteric learning also used a catechetical style of instruction, as this Zodiac catechism shows:

Q. "Where is the animal, O Lanoo? and where the Man?
A. Fused into one, O Master of my Life. The two are one. But both have disappeared and naught remains but the deep fire of my desire.

In Zoroastrianism there is the "ČĪDAG ANDARZ Ī PŌRYŌTKĒŠĀN" also known as "Pand-nāmag ī Zardušt" (Book of the counsels of Zoroaster), which is a post-Sasanian compendium of apothegms intended to instruct every Zoroastrian male, upon his attaining the age of fifteen years, in fundamental religious and ethical principles, as well as in the daily duties incumbent upon him. In Robert Charles Zaehner's words, it "sums up succinctly the whole of Zoroastrian doctrine: it is what every boy and girl of fifteen must know before he or she is invested with the sacred girdle {kusti}."

Judaism does not have a formal catechism. While there have been several attempts to formulate Jewish principles of faith, and some of these have achieved wide acceptance, none can be described as being in the form of a catechism. The most widely recited formulation, Yigdal, is in the form of a hymn based on Maimonides' 13 Articles of Faith.

Bhaktivinoda Thakur's book Jaiva Dharma is an example of Gaudiya Vaishnava catechism. It follows the usual question-answer format.

In the Pali Canon of Theravada Buddhism a small bit of catechism appears as the fourth section of the Khuddakapatha, as well as the forty-third and forty-fourth suttas of the Majjhima Nikaya. Henry Steel Olcott introduced his own form of Buddhist Catechism, appropriated from Christianity, to Ceylon when setting up his Buddhist education system during the late 19th century Buddhist revival on the island.

Epicurean catechism may have originated from the practice of writing outlines of Epicurean doctrines for easy memorization. Epicurus' Letter to Herodotus is known as the "Little Epitome" which young students are instructed to memorize, and in antiquity they would move on to more advanced teachings with the "Large Epitome". The 40 Principal Doctrines also serve the role of a catechism. The philosopher Philodemus of Gadara instructed his students to keep an outline of the doctrines on wealth and economics, so that there are additional doctrines that advanced students may focus on.

Islam teaches children and new Muslims the matters of faith, worship, and ethics in the form of a concise manual. It is also advised for every Muslim to have a basic knowledge of such matters of religion. The first chapter is the book of cleanliness and first to be taught are subjects such as: which are clean, what is clean and what is not clean, what people need to be cleansed from, how they should clean, and which water should they use to clean.

Secular catechisms
In the past, catechisms were written to rehearse the basic knowledge of a non-religious subject. Examples include numerous political catechisms published from the 18th to the 20th century in Europe as well as in North and South America. See also the Catechism of the History of Newfoundland (c1856), the Coal Catechism (1898), and A Catechism of the Steam Engine (1856). 
"Elementary catechism on the Constitution of the United States" Arthur J. Stansbury (1828), "Catechism of the Constitution of the United States" Lewis Cruger (1863) and "A Catechism of the Constitution of the United States of America" John V. Overall. Friedrich Engels' 1847 work Principles of Communism was written as a catechism: Engels subsequently decided that the format was not suited to the addition of historical material which he felt was necessary, and he and Karl Marx restructured the material and used it as the nucleus of The Communist Manifesto.

Some literary works have also taken the form of a catechism. The 17th episode of James Joyce's novel Ulysses, known as "Ithaca", is written in the form of a catechism, as is Ted Hughes' poem Examination at the Womb Door, from the collection Crow. In Henry IV, Part 1: Act V, Scene I, Line 141 Falstaff refers to his monologue as a catechism, explaining his view of the virtue of honor.

See also 

 Catechesis
 Spiritual Milk for Boston Babes

References

Citations

Sources 

 Haemig, Mary Jane (2014), Catechisms, EGO – European History Online, Mainz: Institute of European History, retrieved: 17 March 2021 (pdf).
 Luther, Martin; Lenker, John Nicholas. Luther's two catechisms explained by himself, in six classic writings, Minneapolis, Minn., The Luther Press, 1908 – Google Books
 Palmer, Roland F.; McCausland, John G. The Catechist's Handbook; and, The Church's Guide: Teaching the Canadian [Anglican] Church Catechism to Children and to Older Persons (Bracebridge, Ont.: Society of Saint John the Evangelist, 1962).

Notes

External links

Catechism of the Catholic Church from the official website of the Vatican
Catechisme – Laurence Vaux's Catechism  reprint of the 1583 edition, published by The Chetham Society in 1885
Search the Catechism of the Catholic Church
Westminster Shorter Catechism From Christian Classics Ethereal Library
Westminster Larger Catechism From Christian Classics Ethereal Library
Heidelberg Catechism From Christian Classics Ethereal Library
 by John Bourne
CatechismClass an interactive tool developed to provide the Catechism of the Catholic Church, Baltimore Catechism, and other Catholic catechisms in an integrated format
Series of essays explaining Catechism of the Catholic Church 

 
Christian religious objects
Christian education
Christian genres
Christian terminology